The bes (plural besses) was an Ancient Roman bronze coin produced during the Roman Republic. Valued at two thirds of an as (eight unciae), it was only produced in 126 BC by C. Cassius in combination with the dodrans, another very rare denomination which was valued at three quarters of an as (nine unciae). The obverse head displayed the god Liber facing to the right.

See also

 Roman currency
 Ancient Greek coinage

References 

Coins of ancient Rome